El Remate Airport  is an airstrip  northwest of Santa Rosa del Sara (de) in the Santa Cruz Department of Bolivia.

See also

Transport in Bolivia
List of airports in Bolivia

References

External links 
OpenStreetMap - El Remate

Airports in Santa Cruz Department (Bolivia)